Wendy Leach is a Canadian curler from Regina, Saskatchewan.

In 2000, she was inducted into Canadian Curling Hall of Fame together with all of the 1980 Marj Mitchell team.

On March 21, 1981 she was installed to Saskatchewan Sports Hall of Fame with all of the 1980 Marj Mitchell team.

Teams

References

External links
 

Living people
Canadian women curlers
Curlers from Regina, Saskatchewan
World curling champions
Canadian women's curling champions
Year of birth missing (living people)